The Burlington metropolitan area may refer to:

The Burlington, Vermont metropolitan area, United States
The Burlington, North Carolina metropolitan area, United States
The Burlington, Iowa micropolitan area, United States

See also
Burlington (disambiguation)